Berneville is a commune in the Pas-de-Calais department in the Hauts-de-France region of France.

Geography
A farming village located 5 miles (8 km) southwest of Arras at the junction of the D62 and D67  roads. It is geographically located at an elevation of 148 meters.

Population
The inhabitants are called Bernevillois.

Sights
 The church of St. Géry, dating from the eighteenth century.

Personalities
Maurice d'Hartoy (1892–1981), soldier, politician and writer, born and buried at Berneville.

See also
Communes of the Pas-de-Calais department

References

Communes of Pas-de-Calais